Raj Bhavan (translation: Government House) is the official residence of the governor of Nagaland. It is located in the capital city of Kohima, Nagaland. The present governor of Nagaland is R.N Ravi.

See also
  Government Houses of the British Indian Empire

References

External links
Official website of Raj Bhavan, Nagaland

Governors' houses in India
Government of Nagaland
Kohima